James L. Furrow is an American theologian, currently the Evelyn and Frank Reed Professor of Martial and Family Therapy at Fuller Theological Seminary.

References

Year of birth missing (living people)
Living people
Fuller Theological Seminary faculty
American theologians
University of Tulsa alumni
Fuller Theological Seminary alumni
Kansas State University alumni